Barys is the Belarusian-language form of the given name Boris. It may refer to:

Barys Haravoy (born 1974), retired Belarusian professional footballer
Barys Hrynkevich (born 1981), retired amateur Belarusian freestyle wrestler
Barys Kit (1910–2018), American rocket scientist
Barys Pankrataw (born 1982), Belarusian footballer (goalkeeper)
Barys Pukhouski (born 1987), Belarusian handball player
Barys Rahula (1920–2005), Belarusian military commander serving during World War II
Barys Tasman (born 1954), one of the most respected sports writers of Belarusian journalism

See also
Barys Arena, a multi-purpose indoor arena in Astana, Kazakhstan
Barys Astana, a professional ice hockey team based in Astana, Kazakhstan
Barry's (disambiguation)
Barysh

Belarusian language
Belarusian masculine given names